Shooting at the 1964 Summer Olympics in Tokyo comprised six events, all for men only. They were held between 15 and 17 October 1964.

Medal summary

Participating nations
A total of 262 shooters from 51 nations competed at the Tokyo Games:

Medal count

References

External links
Official Olympic Report

 
1964 Summer Olympics events
1964
Olympics
1964